Merophysiinae is a subfamily of handsome fungus beetles in the family Endomychidae.

Genera
These 15 genera belong to the subfamily Merophysiinae:

 Cholovocera Motschulsky, 1838 r
 Displotera Reitter, 1877 r
 Evolocera Sharp, 1902 i c g r
 Fallia Sharp, 1902 i c g r
 Gomya Dajoz, 1973 r
 Hexasternum Rücker, 1983 r
 Holoparamecus Curtis, 1833 i c g b r
 Lathrapion Rücker, 1983 r
 Lycoperdinella Champion, 1913 r
 Merophysia Lucas, 1852 r
 Pseudevolocera Champion, 1913 r
 Pseudoparamecus Brethes, 1922 r
 Pythlarhinus Dajoz, 1970 r
 Reitteria Leder, 1872 c g r
 Rueckeria Arriaga-Varela, 2018

Data sources: i = ITIS, c = Catalogue of Life, g = GBIF, b = Bugguide.net, r = Rücker,

References

Further reading

External links

 

Endomychidae